Muhammad Aamir Iqbal Shah is a Pakistani politician, who served as a Member of the Provincial Assembly of the Punjab from July 2022 till January 2023. He also served in this position from 2002 to 2007 and again from May 2013 to May 2018.

Early life and education
He was born on 15 November 1978 in Lodhran to Muhammad Iqbal Shah.

He graduated from Bahauddin Zakariya University in 1997 and has the degree of Bachelor of Arts.

Political career
He was elected to the Provincial Assembly of the Punjab as a candidate of Pakistan Muslim League (Q) (PML-Q) from Constituency PP-207 (Lodhran-I) in 2002 Pakistani general election. He received 44,149 votes and defeated a candidate of Pakistan Peoples Party (PPP).

He ran for the seat of the Provincial Assembly of the Punjab as a candidate of PML-Q from Constituency PP-207 (Lodhran-I) in 2008 Pakistani general election but was unsuccessful. He received 22,519 votes and lost the seat to a candidate of PPP.

He was re-elected to the Provincial Assembly of the Punjab as a candidate of Pakistan Muslim League (N) from Constituency PP-207 (Lodhran-I) in 2013 Pakistani general election.

He was re-elected to the Provincial Assembly of Punjab as a candidate of the Pakistan Tehreek-e-Insaf from Constituency PP-224 (Lodhran-I) in the 2022 Punjab provincial by-elections.

References

Living people
Punjab MPAs 2013–2018
1978 births
Pakistan Muslim League (N) politicians
People from Lodhran District
Punjab MPAs 2002–2007